The Dr. Charles Jordan House is a historic house at 9 Jordan Avenue in Wakefield, Massachusetts.  Built c. 1885, it is one Wakefield's most elaborate Queen Anne Victorian houses.  The -story wood-frame house is unusual for having a hipped roof; it also has a tower in the northwest corner, and a porch with Italianate pillars brackets.  The house was built by Dr. Charles Jordan, a local physician and pharmacist with extensive land holdings in the area.

The house was listed on the National Register of Historic Places in 1989.

See also
National Register of Historic Places listings in Wakefield, Massachusetts
National Register of Historic Places listings in Middlesex County, Massachusetts

References

Houses in Wakefield, Massachusetts
Houses on the National Register of Historic Places in Wakefield, Massachusetts
Queen Anne architecture in Massachusetts
Houses completed in 1885